Herman Weigel (born 22 March 1950 in Moers) is a German film producer and screenwriter. He is one of the writers and producer of the television series Hausmeister Krause. Weigel is a graduate of the Munich Academy for Television and Film.

References

External links

1950 births
Living people
People from Moers
Mass media people from North Rhine-Westphalia
German male writers